Aksak is a Polish coat of arms of Tatar origin. It was used by several szlachta families in the times of the Polish–Lithuanian Commonwealth.

History
 
Kasper Okińczyc was granted with a noble title by King Jan III Sobieski in 1683, after the Battle of Vienna, together with an estate called Luzinky. He was given also the command over the garrison of the city of Mścisław (modern Mstislav, Belarus), close to the border with Muscovy

The name of the coat of arms stems from Okińczyc's personal nickname, possibly a Turkish language word aksak meaning lame. 
Possibly Okińczyc received a wound during the battle and started using the term as his nickname and later as a name of the symbol of his family.

Blazon

The blazon exists also with a heart pierced by an arrow, with blood drops.

Notable bearers
Notable bearers of this coat of arms include:

 Okińczyc family

Gallery

See also
 Polish heraldry
 Heraldic family
 List of Polish nobility coats of arms

Bibliography
 Tadeusz Gajl: Herbarz polski od średniowiecza do XX wieku : ponad 4500 herbów szlacheckich 37 tysięcy nazwisk 55 tysięcy rodów. L&L, 2007. .

References

Aksak